The list of shipwrecks in the 1710s includes ships sunk, foundered, grounded, or otherwise lost during the 1710s.

1710

March

2 March

July

10 July

December

11 December

Unknown date

1711

October

7 October

November

23 November

Unknown date

Unknown date

1712

March

16 March

June

August

24 August

1713

March

15 March

July

11 July

1714

May

28 May

July

27 July

October

10 October

November

2 November

January

1 January

1715

June

27 June

July

31 July

August

25 August

1716

August

September

20 September

Unknown date

October

20 October

November

9 November

10 November

December

1 December

Unknown date

1717

April

26 April

December

25 December

1718

June

10 June

1719

March

2 March

 on the outward leg of her maiden voyage to Madras.

Unknown date

October

1 October

Notes
 Until 1752, in Great Britain and its possessions, the year began on Lady Day (25 March) Thus 24 March 1710 was followed by 25 March 1711. 31 December 1711 was followed by 1 January 1711.  In most of Europe (though not Russia or Greece) and Latin America, 24 March 1711 was followed by 25 March 1711, and 31 December 1711 was followed by 1 January 1712.

References

1710s